Firestone Building Products is a subsidiary of the Holcim Group, one of the world's largest building materials manufacturing company.

FSBP operates 21 manufacturing facilities in North America and produces single-ply and asphalt-based roofing membranes, polyiso insulation, and roofing accessories.

FSBP also has international facilities and support in Canada, Europe, Middle East, Asia, Latin America and the Caribbean.

References

External links 
 

American companies established in 1980
Building materials companies of the United States
Companies based in Nashville, Tennessee
Manufacturing companies established in 1980
Manufacturing companies of the United States
2021 mergers and acquisitions
Holcim Group